Lieutenant-General Willem (or William) Anne van Keppel, 2nd Earl of Albemarle  (5 June 1702 – 22 December 1754) was a British soldier, diplomat and courtier.

He held various roles in the household of George II (1683-1760), who was a personal friend, participated in negotiations to end the 1718 to 1720 War of the Quadruple Alliance and was British Ambassador to France from 1748 to 1754.

During the 1740 to 1748 War of the Austrian Succession, he commanded troops in Flanders and was transferred to Scotland following the outbreak of the Jacobite rising of 1745. After Culloden, he was appointed Commander-in-Chief, Scotland before returning to Flanders in 1747.

Despite his many offices and inheriting a large fortune, he was known as the "Spendthrift Earl" and died in 1754 leaving his family nothing but debts.

Life

William (or Willem) Anne van Keppel was born 5 June 1702 at Whitehall Palace in London, only son of Arnold, 1st Earl of Albemarle (1670-1718) and Geertruid van der Duyn (died 1741). His father was popular with both William III and Queen Anne, who was his godmother.

In 1722, he married Anne Lennox (1703 – 1789), daughter of the Duke of Richmond, an illegitimate son of Charles II. She was Lady of the Bedchamber to Caroline of Ansbach (1683-1737); she was reputedly a great favourite of George II, who paid her a pension of £1,500 per annum when Albemarle died in 1754.

They had over fifteen children, of whom six survived to adulthood; George, 3rd Earl of Albemarle (1724-1772), Augustus (1725-1786), William (1727-1782), Frederick (1728–1777), Caroline (1733–69) mother of Sir Robert Adair and Elizabeth (1739-1768).

Career
Albemarle was educated in the Dutch province of Gelderland, where the family originated. After returning to England in 1717, he was commissioned in the Coldstream Foot Guards and succeeded his father as Earl of Albemarle in 1718. Over the next few years, he and a colleague John Huske accompanied the Earl of Cadogan in meetings with the Dutch over the War of the Quadruple Alliance; financially exhausted by the War of the Spanish Succession, they were anxious to avoid another. The Treaty of The Hague was agreed in 1720, although negotiations continued with Austria.

Like his father, Albemarle appears to have had a talent for making powerful friends; his marriage in 1722 was held at Cadogan's house near Caversham, outside Reading. He was also made Lord of the Bedchamber to the future George II, then Prince of Wales, a position he retained until 1751. The role provided proximity to the monarch; its holder was a trusted confidant and often extremely powerful.

In 1737, he was appointed Governor of Virginia, which he retained until his death, despite never setting foot in it. As was common, the administrative work was done by his deputy Sir William Gooch, although the two frequently clashed over appointments. Albemarle County, Virginia was named after him; it is better known as the location of Monticello, the estate built by Thomas Jefferson.

Between 1713 and 1739, Britain was mostly at peace; Albemarle was Colonel of the 29th Regiment of Foot from 1731 to 1733 before transferring to the Royal Horse Guards. As personal escorts to the king, they rarely left London but Albemarle commanded them at Dettingen in 1743, when George II became the last British monarch to command troops in battle. He became Colonel of the Coldstream Guards in 1744 and fought under the Duke of Cumberland at Fontenoy in April 1745.

With the outbreak of the 1745 Jacobite Rising, Albemarle was sent to Newcastle as deputy to the elderly George Wade. He commanded the government front line at Culloden in April 1746 and subsequently appointed Commander-in-Chief, Scotland, despite referring to it as "this cursed country". He told the Duke of Newcastle, then Secretary of State for the Southern Department that "my predecessors have split against a sharp rock". The appointment of a senior and trusted subordinate reflected a widespread perception among both government officials and Jacobite rebels that another landing was imminent.

The immediate focus was capturing the fugitive Charles Stuart but despite a reward of £30,000, he evaded Albemarle's patrols and escaped to France in September. In 2018, previously unknown records from 1746 and 1747 were discovered in Ipswich; these include intelligence reports on the search and details showing that after Culloden, Albemarle received a thousand guineas and the Prince's silver-gilt travelling canteen.

With his headquarters in Edinburgh, Albemarle divided Scotland into four military districts and carried out measures intended to bring the Highlands under control. They included extending the military road network begun in 1715 and placing permanent garrisons at key points, whose role was to enforce the 1746 Disarming and Dress Acts. In February 1747, he was relieved as commander in Scotland and rejoined the army in Flanders, commanding the British infantry at Lauffeld in July. Although this was a decisive French victory that effectively ended the War of the Austrian Succession, his troops' disciplined fire helped the Pragmatic Army make an orderly retreat. 

After the war ended with the 1748 Treaty of Aix-la-Chapelle, he was sent to Paris as Ambassador, where he was a great success, entertaining on a lavish scale and sharing a mistress with Giacomo Casanova. He was made a Knight of the Garter in 1750, then a Privy Counsellor the following year.

Albemarle died aged 52 in Paris on 22 December 1754, returning home from a pre-Christmas supper; he was buried on 21 February 1755 in Grosvenor Chapel on South Audley Street in London. When his long-term colleague and friend John Huske died in 1761, he instructed his coffin be placed next to that of Albemarle.

Notoriously extravagant, he died leaving nothing but debts, although his sons had successful careers; in 1740, Augustus Keppel participated in Anson's capture of the Manila galleon, which made the officers wealthy men in their own right.

In her biography of Madame de Pompadour, the writer Nancy Mitford remarks that given his love of all things French, it was a blessing Albemarle died before the Seven Years' War broke out. She records that the French admired his love of life and wit; when a rapacious mistress admired the beauty of the stars, he replied that unfortunately, he was unable to buy them for her.

Notes

References

Sources
 
 
 
 
 Mitford, Nancy;   Madame de Pompadour Hamish Hamilton, 1954

External links
 
 

|-

 

1702 births
1754 deaths
Colonial governors of Virginia
Willem
Knights Companion of the Order of the Bath
Knights of the Garter
Members of the Privy Council of Great Britain
People from Westminster
Willem van Keppel, 3rd
British Army lieutenant generals
British Life Guards officers
Coldstream Guards officers
29th Regiment of Foot officers
Worcestershire Regiment officers
British Army personnel of the Jacobite rising of 1745
Diplomatic peers
British Army personnel of the War of the Austrian Succession
Ambassadors of Great Britain to France
Grooms of the Stool
Court of George II of Great Britain
Military personnel from London